The list of shipwrecks in 1801 includes ships sunk, foundered, wrecked, grounded, or otherwise lost during 1801.

January

1 January

2 January

4 January

5 January

7 January

8 January

14 January

17 January

19 January

23 January

25 January

26 January

28 January

29 January

Unknown date

February

2 February

3 February

6 February

8 February

9 February

11 February

12 February

13 February

16 February

17 February

20 February

21 February

24 February

Unknown date

March

2 March

6 March

15 March

16 March

17 March

19 March

20 March

23 March

24 March

25 March

29 March

Unknown date

April

1 April

2 April

4 April

9 April

10 April

12 April

13 April

21 April

29 April

30 April

Unknown date

May

2 May

3 May

Unknown date

June

8 June

9 June

Unknown date

July

6 July

7 July

13 July

16 July

20 July

21 July

22 July

25 July

30 July

Unknown date

August

3 August

7 August

9 August

10 August

18 August

21 August

31 August

Unknown date

September

4 September

5 September

8 September

10 September

19 September

20 September

21 September

24 September

25 September

29 September

Unknown date

October

5 October

20 October

24 October

25 October

28 October

Unknown date

November

2 November

3 November

4 November

5 November

9 November

16 November

17 November

19 November

20 November

21 November

22 November

23 November

24 November

25 November

27 November

29 November

Unknown date

December

2 December

4 December

5 December

6 December

9 December

14 December

15 December

17 December

21 December

23 December

24 December

25 December

26 December

Unknown date

Unknown date

References 

1801